Candlemas or Candlemass is the Christian feast of the Presentation of Jesus at the Temple.

Candlemas or Candlemass may also refer to: 

 Candlemass (band), a Swedish doom metal band 
 Candlemass (album), 2005
 Candlemas Islands, a group of sub-Antarctic Islands
 Candlemas Island, the main island of that group 
 Candlemas Massacre, an incident in King William's War, in 1692
 Candlemas Day (Scotland), a term day in the legal year

See also